Hell Girl is an anime, that was produced in three seasons between 2005 and 2009, followed by a fourth season made in 2017, by Studio Deen. The plot of the episodes follows a girl named Ai Enma, also known as the Jigoku Shōjo or Hell Girl, and her group of followers as they carry out her duty of striking contracts that involve ferrying hated souls to Hell.

The first season, titled , was directed by Takahiro Ōmori and written by Hiroshi Watanabe.This season revolves around the investigations of Hajime Shibatao and Tsugumi Shibata into Ai Enma's secrets. It premiered across Japan on Animax on October 4, 2005, and episode 26 aired on April 4, 2006. The second season, titled , was also directed by Takahiro Ōmori and written by Hiroshi Watanabe. This season details the past of each of Ai's followers and the story of a boy named Takuma Kurebayashi. It aired across Japan from October 7, 2006 to April 7, 2007 on Animax and spanned 26 episodes. The third season, titled , was directed by Hiroshi Watanabe and written by Ken'ichi Kanemaki. The third season revolved around Ai's possession of a middle school student, named Yuzuki Mikage and Yuzuki's past. It aired across Japan from October 10, 2008 to April 4, 2009 on Tokyo MX spanning 26 episodes.

Animax later translated and dubbed the first season of the series into English for broadcast across its English language networks in Southeast Asia and South Asia. Animax also aired the series worldwide across its other networks in various other languages, including in Hong Kong, Taiwan, South Korea, Vietnam, Europe and other regions. The first season of the series was licensed for North American distribution by Funimation Entertainment. The series began broadcasting on the United States cable/satellite channel IFC in July 2008. The next 52 episodes have been licensed by Sentai Filmworks under the title Hell Girl: Series 2.

Series overview

Episode list

Anime

Hell Girl 
 Opening theme: 
 Lyrics: SNoW, Hideaki Yamano
 Composition: SNoW, Asanjō Shindō
 Arrangement: Asanjō Shindō, Ken'ichi Fujita
 Performance: SNoW
 Ending theme: 
 Lyrics: Hitomi Mieno
 Composition: Masara Nishida
 Arrangement: Masara Nishida
 Performance: Mamiko Noto

Hell Girl: Two Mirrors (Futakomori) 
 Opening theme: NightmaRe
 Lyrics: Hideaki Yamano
 Composition: SNoW, Asanjō Shindō
 Performance: SNoW
 Ending theme: 
 Lyrics: Aa (savage genius)
 Composition: Takumi (savage genius)
 Arrangement: Masara Nishida
 Performance: Mamiko Noto

Hell Girl: Three Vessels (Mitsuganae) 

 Opening theme: 
 Lyrics: Nana Kitade
 Composition: Velvet Romica
 Performance: Nana Kitade
 Ending theme: 
 Lyrics: Hitomi Mieno
 Composition: Asami Kousei
 Arrangement: Yasutaka Mizushima
 Performance: Mamiko Noto
 Release Date: December 17, 2008

Hell Girl: The Fourth Twilight (Yoi no Togi) 
 Opening theme: 
 Performance: Mio Yamazaki
 Ending theme: 
 Performance: Mamiko Noto

Live action

Hell Girl

References

External links 
  (anime official website) - season 1 episode list 
 Jigoku Shōjo: Futakomori at Tokyo MX - click Story to get to season 2 episode list 
 Jigoku Shōjo: Mitsuganae  at Tokyo MX - click Story to get to season 3 episode list 

Lists of anime episodes